Chaquicocha (possibly from Quechua ch'aki dry, qucha lake, "dry lake", Hispanicized spelling Chaquicocha) is a  mountain at a little lake of that name in the Urubamba mountain range in the Andes of Peru. It is located in the Cusco Region, Calca Province, Calca District, and in the Urubamba Province, in the districts of Huayllabamba and Yucay. It lies southwest of Huamanchoque and southeast of Chicon. 

Like Yanacocha ("black lake") south of it Chaquicocha is surrounded by woods of queñua or quewiña (polylepis).

See also 
 Lares trek
 Machu Qullqa

References 

Mountains of Peru
Mountains of Cusco Region
Lakes of Peru
Lakes of Cusco Region